Minuscule 194 (in the Gregory-Aland numbering), A130 (Soden), is a Greek minuscule manuscript of the New Testament, on parchment. Paleographically it has been assigned to the 11th century. It has marginalia.

Description 

The codex contains almost complete text of the four Gospels, with a commentary, on 263 thick parchment leaves (size ). The 6th folio was supplied by later hand.

The text is written in one column per page, biblical text in 25 lines per page, and commentary text in 46 lines per page. The biblical text is surrounded by a catena (Victor's on St. Mark). Text of Matthew begins in 3:7. Catena is similar to that of 34.

There is also a division according to the Ammonian Sections (in Mark 241 Sections, the last in 16:20) (no references to the Eusebian Canons).

Text 

The Greek text of the codex is a representative of the Byzantine text-type. Aland placed it in Category V.

It was not examined by the Claremont Profile Method.

It lacks the text of Matthew 16:2b–3 (signs of the times).

History 

It was examined by Birch, Scholz, and Burgon. C. R. Gregory saw it in 1886.

It is currently housed at the Laurentian Library (Plutei. VI. 33), in Florence, Italy.

See also 
 List of New Testament minuscules
 Biblical manuscript
 Textual criticism

References

Further reading 

 

Greek New Testament minuscules
11th-century biblical manuscripts